Polewali is the capital of the Polewali Mandar Regency of West Sulawesi, Indonesia.

It is a seaside town on the coast of Mandar gulf. Polewali is the largest town in the province of West Sulawesi with 54,843 inhabitants at the 2010 Census and 65,800 at the 2020 Census.

Climate
Polewali has a tropical rainforest climate (Af) with moderate rainfall from Julyto September and heavy rainfall in the remaining months.

References

Populated places in West Sulawesi
Regency seats of West Sulawesi